Miodek turecki is a candy traditionally sold in Kraków, Poland on the gates of cemeteries during All Saints' Day and All Souls' Day. Sometimes sold by churches during autumn parish festivals.
Miodek turecki has an irregular shape, a hard topping with a light honey taste, which may either break apart or crumble, with its base ingredient being caramelised sugar with the addition of aroma oils and colourings, into which are blended in crumbled nuts. The original miodek turecki is made from white caramel sweet cream, although other variations exist, dependent on the types of sweet additives and aromatics, e.g. miodek kakaowy (cocoa), kawowy (coffee) or waniliowy (vanilla).

See also
 List of Polish candy
Lesser Poland cuisine
List of Polish desserts
List of Polish dishes

References

Kraków
Polish desserts
Polish cuisine